These are the final regular season standings for the International Basketball League which began play in 2005:

2005

2006

2007

Standings